Odontoglossum lindleyanum, the Lindley's odontoglossum, is a species of orchid found from northwestern Venezuela to Ecuador.

lindleyanum